Chandavarkar is a surname.

Notable Chandavarkars
Leena Chandavarkar, Bollywood actress
N.G. Chandavarkar, Prarathana Samaj figure and President of Indian National Congress
Rajnarayan Chandavarkar, British historian

Marathi people
Indian surnames